Brass Fever was an American jazz musical ensemble, which recorded two albums for Impulse! Records. Consisting of both session musicians and leaders such as Shelly Manne, their two albums covered jazz and R&B genres.

Their second album charted at #98 on the US Billboard R&B chart.

Discography
1975: Brass Fever (Impulse!)
1976: Time Is Running Out (Impulse!)

Personnel
Flute - Buddy Collette
Percussion - Eddie "Bongo" Brown
Drums - Shelly Manne
Electric Bass - Scott Edwards
Electric Guitar - Lee Ritenour
Electric Piano - Sonny Burke
Alto Saxophone - John Handy
Trombone - Charlie Loper, Garnett Brown, George Bohanon
Trumpet - Oscar Brashear
Piano, Organ, Clavinet [Clavinette] - Phil Wright
Conductor - Wade Marcus
Arrangements - Esmond Edwards

References

Impulse! Records artists
American jazz ensembles
American funk musical groups
American brass bands